This article lists all power stations in Armenia.

Thermal

Non-renewable

Nuclear

Renewable

Hydroelectric

Geothermal

See also 

 Electricity sector in Armenia
 List of power stations in Asia
 List of power stations in Europe
 List of largest power stations in the world

Armenia
 
Lists of buildings and structures in Armenia